AMC Fight Nights (or Fight Nights Global before 2021) is a Russian mixed martial arts organization that previously hosted K-1 and other martial arts events. It is one of the largest promotion companies in the world and features some of the top-ranking fighters of the sport.

Fight Nights Global produces events worldwide, with the first one being held in 2010 in Moscow. As of 2018, Fight Nights Global has held over 80 events in different cities: Saint Petersburg, Novosibirsk, Yekaterinburg, Nizhny Novgorod, Omsk, Rostov-On-Don, Perm, Khabarovsk, Vladivostok, Sochi, Bryansk, Kostroma, Nizhnevartovsk, Kaspiysk, Astana, Elista, Grozny, Dushanbe, Minsk and more.

In different years the company's shows featured Fedor Emelianenko, Batu Khasikov, Vitaly Minakov, Rasul Mirzaev, Ali Bagautinov, Vladimir Mineev, Andrei Arlovski, Alexander Shlemenko, Shamil Zavurov, Murad Machaev, Gasan Umalatov, Antônio Silva, Viktor Pešta, Fábio Maldonado and many other mixed martial artists.

History

Founding of Fight Nights Global 
The company was founded in 2010 by a Russian athlete, businessman and sports ambassador Kamil Gadzhiev, together with a multiple time world kickboxing champion Batu Khasikov, a television producer Sangadji Tarbaev, the "SHANDESIGN" studio head Sergei Shanovich and the Goldman Sachs Russia CEO Sergey Arsenyev. At that time the company was called FIGHT NIGHTS and later rebranded as Eurasia Fight Nights (EFN).

2010-2015: early years 
Initially, Fight Nights Global (at that time called FIGHT NIGHTS) fights were held in a ring under MMA and K-1 rules. The first event featured Lightweight Grand Prix, which was won by Murad Machaev. In the main event Batu Khasikov knocked out Ricardo Fernandes. Rasul Mirzaev defeated Marat Pekov via judges decision and became the first FIGHT NIGHTS champion in the Featherweight category.

The first high-profile event happened in November 2011 in Moscow and featured the Greek kickboxer Mike Zambidis facing Batu Khasikov. Batu won by TKO in the first round and broke his opponent's jaw. 

In 2012, the company held seven major events with the final one being "FIGHT NIGHTS: Battle of Moscow 9" on December 16. The show featured the debut of the UFC ex-champion Andrei Arlovski. The  Belarusian fighter defeated Mike Hayes from the United States via a unanimous decision.

Vitaly Minakov, Fight Nights Global promotion's household name, signed a contract with Bellator MMA in 2012.

In 2013, Vitaly won the Bellator heavyweight Grand Prix tournament and then won the Bellator MMA belt by knocking out Alexander Volkov in the first round. In April 2013, Vitaly became the first FIGHT NIGHTS fighter to make his way to the UFC. The next one was Ali Bagautinov who competed in the Flyweight division and signed a contract with the UFC after a victory over the experienced Japanese mixed martial artist Seiji Ozuka.

In June 2013 the company started using an octagonal cage that is popular in the MMA industry. In November 2013, the company hosted the first event outside of Russia, “FIGHT NIGHTS: Battle on the Nyamiha" at Minsk-Arena, Belarus. The main attraction of the night was the  home performance by Andrei Arlovski.

Batu Khasikov had his last professional fight in March 2014 at “Fight Nights: Battle Of Moscow 15” where he again fought Mike Zambidis. The fight went all five rounds, Khasikov was the victor. Vladimir Mineev debuted in MMA at “Fight Nights: Battle Of Moscow 17”. The final tournament of 2014 featured Alexander Shlemenko vs. Yasubey Enomoto.

2015-2016: rise in popularity, rebranding and Summa acquisition 
In 2015 the company hosted four major shows (Fight Nights: Battle Of Moscow 19, Fight Nights: Sochi, Fight Nights: Dagestan, Fight Nights: Petersburg) and eighteen selection tournaments “Fight club FIGHT NIGHTS".

Vitaly Minakov used his interim in Bellator MMA to return to the Fight Nights Global promotion. From July 2015 to June 2016 the four-time Sambo world champion fought in 4 matches, winning early victories over Adam Maciejewski (Poland), Geronimo dos Santos (Brazil), Josh Copeland (USA) and Peter Graham (Australia).

In 2016 the company was bought by Summa Group, a conglomerate that invested in port logistics, engineering, construction, telecommunications, sports, oil and gas that was founded by Dagestani billionaire Ziyavudin Magomedov. Kamil Gadzhiev, who is also the Vice-President of Moscow MMA Federation, became the president of the newly established Fight Nights Global. Backed by substantial investments of Summa Group, 2016 was the year of a massive breakthrough for FNG on the Russian market.

Fight Nights Global 50 (June 17, 2016) in Saint Petersburg featured a fight card headlined by Fedor Emelianenko. 4 years after retirement, "The Last Emperor" decided to come back to professional sports in the Fight Nights Global cage versus one of the most uncompromising strikers of the UFC, Fabio Maldonado. The tough match ended with a split decision win for the Russian athlete. The event was broadcast worldwide via UFC Fight Pass.

2017-present: global growth 
In 2017 Fight Nights Global determined champions in all eight weight categories among men and inked plenty of international talent to the roster including Rousimar Palhares, Josh Hill, Tyson Nam and the returning Ali Bagautinov to multi-fight contracts.

The company hosted 25 events, discovering new cities and countries, including Astana and Almaty in Kazakhstan, Dushanbe in Tajikistan, Omsk, Penza, Tolyatti, Surgut, Krasnodar, Yekaterinburg, Bryansk and Ulan-Ude in Russia.

Fight Night Global president Kamil Gadzhiev announced that the promotion will introduce the Anti-Doping Control System.

Fight Nights Global 68, which took place during the International Economic Forum in Saint Petersburg, showcased Vitaly Minakov vs. Antonio Silva. Later, Novosibirsk hosted Fight Nights Global 69, where Ali Bagautinov defeated Pedro Nobre. In September, the notorious Fight Nights Global 73 took place. It featured the Russian-Brazilian confrontations Shamil Amirov vs. Rousimar Palhares, Kurban Omarov vs. Fabio Maldonado and Akhmed Aliev vs. Diego Brandao in the main event, which ended with a scandal.

Other events of the year were Fight Nights Global 77, where newly-signed Nikita Krylov KO’ed Emanuel Newton and Fight Nights Global 82, where the undefeated heavyweight Vitaly Minakov TKO’ed the top fighter from the USA, Tony Johnson.

In 2018 the company announced more international shows, including events in Brazil, USA and EU.

Rename to AMC Fight Nights Global

In 2020 November Fight Nights Global owner Kamil Gadzhiev sold his promotion to  AMC Company owner Amir Muradov. After that they renamed the promotion to AMC Fight Nights Global

Rules 
Fight Nights Global rules are based on the Russian MMA regulations. Elbow strikes on the ground are legal. Referees have the right to raise fighters in a stand up in the absence of activity. If the fight is a draw, additional rounds are not assigned. A typical event lasts five hours and features 11 bouts. Bouts last 3 rounds 5 minutes each and champion bouts or main event bouts are 5 rounds 5 minutes each. The championship features 8 male and 2 female weight categories: 57 kg, 61 kg, 66 kg, 70 kg, 77 kg, 84 kg, 93 kg and over 93 kg.

List of AMC Fight Nights events 
 

 By year 
 2010 in Fight Nights Global
 2011 in Fight Nights Global
 2012 in Fight Nights Global
 2016 in Fight Nights Global
 2017 in Fight Nights Global
 2018 in Fight Nights Global
 2019 in Fight Nights Global
 2020 in Fight Nights Global
 2021 in AMC Fight Nights

 Scheduled events

 Events by date

Current champions

Mixed martial arts

Championship history

Heavyweight Championship
over 93 kg (over 205 lb)

Light Heavyweight Championship
93 kg (205 lbs)

Middleweight Championship
84 kg (185 lbs)

Welterweight Championship
77 kg (170 lbs)

Lightweight Championship

70 kg (155 lbs)

Featherweight Championship
66 kg (145 lbs)

Bantamweight Championship
61 kg (135 lbs)

Flyweight Championship
57 kg (125 lbs)

Women's Bantamweight Championship
61 kg (135 lbs)

Notable fighters 

This is a list of fighters who currently compete and have competed in the past for Fight Nights Global:

Mixed Martial Arts
     
  Ildemar Alcântara
  Sultan Aliev
  Andrei Arlovski   
  Ali Bagautinov 
  Diego Brandão
  Julia Berezikova
  Rich Crunkilton
  Fedor Emelianenko
  Yasubey Enomoto
  Efrain Escudero
  Maiquel Falcão
  Vener Galiev
  Peter Graham 
  Michael Graves 
  Mike Hayes
  Ali Isayev
  Joanna Jędrzejczyk
  Tony Johnson
  Ivan Jorge
  Masanori Kanehara 
  Nikita Krylov
  Alexei Kudin
  Murad Machaev
  Ruslan Magomedov
  Levan Makashvili
  Fábio Maldonado
  Danny Martinez
  Derrick Mehmen 
  Vitaly Minakov
  Vladimir Mineev
  Rasul Mirzaev
  Marina Mokhnatkina
  Tyson Nam
  Emanuel Newton
  Diego Nunes 
  Valentijn Overeem
  Rousimar Palhares
  Viktor Pešta
  Trevor Prangley
  Brett Rogers
  Eddie Sanchez
  Alexander Sarnavskiy 
  Fabiano Scherner
  Alexander Shlemenko
  Kirill Sidelnikov
  Antônio Silva
  Elias Silvério
  Chommanee Sor Taehiran
 Rameau Thierry Sokoudjou
  Dominique Steele
  Akop Stepanyan
  Tim Sylvia  
  Michail Tsarev
  Albert Tumenov
  Shamil Zavurov

Kickboxing
     
  Dzhabar Askerov
  Redouan Cairo
  Gago Drago
  Andrey Gerasimchuk
  Karapet Karapetyan
  Batu Khasikov
  Albert Kraus
  Vladimir Mineev
  Alexei Papin
  Ramazan Ramazanov
 Rameau Thierry Sokoudjou
  Alexander Stetsurenko
  Warren Stevelmans 
  Mike Zambidis

References

External links
 Fight Nights Global at Sherdog
 Fight Nights Global Official Site

 
Organizations established in 2010
Mixed martial arts organizations
Sports organizations of Russia
Mixed martial arts in Russia
2010 establishments in Russia